Rawlins may refer to:

People
Rawlins (surname)

Places
Rawlins, Wyoming
Rawlins County, Kansas
Rawlins Cross, St. John's
Rawlins Township, Jo Daviess County, Illinois

Schools
Rawlins Community College

Music 
Rawlins Cross - Newfoundland Celtic Rock band

See also
Rawlings (disambiguation)